It's a Mad, Mad, Mad, Mad World is a 1963 American comedy film produced and directed by Stanley Kramer with a story and screenplay by William Rose and Tania Rose. The film, starring Spencer Tracy with an all-star cast of comedians, is about the madcap pursuit of $350,000 in stolen cash by a diverse and colorful group of strangers. It premiered on November 7, 1963. The principal cast features Edie Adams, Milton Berle, Sid Caesar, Buddy Hackett, Ethel Merman, Dorothy Provine, Mickey Rooney, Dick Shawn, Phil Silvers, Terry-Thomas, and Jonathan Winters.

The film marked the first time Kramer directed a comedy, though he had produced the comedy So This Is New York in 1948. He is best known for producing and directing, in his own words, "heavy drama" about social problems, such as The Defiant Ones, Inherit the Wind, Judgment at Nuremberg, and Guess Who's Coming to Dinner. His first attempt at directing a comedy film paid off immensely as It's a Mad, Mad, Mad, Mad World became a critical and commercial success in 1963 and was nominated for six Academy Awards, winning for Best Sound Editing, and two Golden Globe Awards.

Against Kramer's wishes, the film suffered severe cuts by its distributor United Artists in order to give the film a shorter running time for its general release. On October 15, 2013, it was announced that the Criterion Collection had collaborated with Metro-Goldwyn-Mayer, United Artists, and film restoration expert Robert A. Harris to reconstruct and restore It's a Mad, Mad, Mad, Mad World to be as close as possible to the original 202-minute version envisioned by Kramer. It was released in a five-disc "Dual Format" Blu-ray/DVD Combo Pack on January 21, 2014.

The film featured at number 40 in the American Film Institute's list 100 Years...100 Laughs.

Plot
"Smiler" Grogan, a just-released convict jailed for robbery 15 years earlier, escapes police surveillance but crashes his car on California State Route 74. Five motorists stop to help him: Melville Crump, a dentist on a second honeymoon with his wife Monica; Lennie Pike, a furniture mover; Ding Bell and Benjy Benjamin, two friends on their way to Las Vegas; and J. Russell Finch, a seaweed-business owner, traveling with his wife Emmeline and his loud, obnoxious mother-in-law Mrs. Marcus. Just before he dies, Grogan tells them about $350,000 (equivalent to $ million in ) buried in Santa Rosita State Park under "a big W". After the group fails to come up with a satisfactory way to split the money, they give up negotiating and begin a mad dash to find it.  Unbeknownst to all, Captain Culpeper, chief of detectives of the Santa Rosita Police Department, who had been working the Grogan case for years and hoped to solve it and retire, has everyone tracked.

All the motorists experience setbacks on the way to the park. The Crumps charter a rickety biplane to Santa Rosita. When they stop in a hardware store for supplies, they are inadvertently locked in the store's basement. After several failed attempts to break out, they blow out the wall of the basement with dynamite and hire a cab to get to the park. Bell and Benjamin charter a modern plane, but, when their alcoholic pilot knocks himself out, they have to land the plane themselves, causing chaos among the air traffic controllers as the plane flies wildly out of control. After bringing the plane to the ground, they also hire a cab to drive them to the park. The Finches' car collides with Pike's furniture van, and Russell persuades British Army Lieutenant Colonel J. Algernon Hawthorne to drive them to Santa Rosita. After a nasty argument, Mrs. Marcus and Emeline leave the two men to hitch their own ride.

Pike stops motorist Otto Meyer for a ride; however, after Pike tells Meyer about the money, Meyer abandons him and convinces two service station employees to detain Pike. Pike destroys the station, steals a tow truck, and picks up Mrs. Marcus and Emmeline. Mrs. Marcus calls her dimwitted son Sylvester, who lives near the park; however, she claims Russell "assaulted" her, causing Sylvester to panic and drive towards her instead of getting the money for her. Meyer, meanwhile, picks up a stranded motorist and helps him get back home. Trying to get back to the highway, Meyer fails at crossing a deep river and his car is swept away, forcing him to steal another motorist's car.

Meanwhile, Culpepper has a furious argument with his wife and daughter, then is told his pension will be a pittance, and has a mental breakdown. He instructs all the law enforcement following the motorists to back off on his signal – because none of the motorists know him – and heads for the park. After many mishaps, everyone reaches the Park and begins searching for the "big W". Culpeper gives the pre-arranged signal and goes in alone. Emmeline finds the "big W" first, quickly followed by Pike, who tells the others. After the money is dug up, Culpeper identifies himself, but does not arrest them. He persuades the motorists to turn themselves in.

Chief Aloysius successfully blackmails the mayor into tripling Culpeper’s pension. He tries to get word of this to Culpeper, but fails because Culpeper has already gone after the stolen money. Figuring out Culpeper’s real motivation, the police chief sadly orders his friend’s arrest. Suspicious about why Culpeper let them go, the motorists follow him and notice he is not returning to the police station. They chase him to a condemned building, where the men corner him on a rickety fire escape which breaks because of their combined weight. In the struggle, Culpeper drops the briefcase containing the money, scattering the cash to a crowd of people in the street below. When they all pile onto a fire department ladder sent to rescue them, their combined weight causes it to spin uncontrollably and toss them wildly in different directions, leaving most of them heavily injured.

In the prison hospital, the men bemoan the loss of the money and blame their injuries on Culpeper. Culpeper responds that because of his lost pension, the ruined relationship with his family and the likelihood that the judge will probably be lenient with them but throw the book at him, it will be a long time before he laughs again. Mrs. Marcus, flanked by Emmeline and Monica (all in prison attire) enters and Mrs. Marcus begins loudly berating the men, only for her to slip on Benjamin's dropped banana peel. All the men except Sylvester roar with laughter, and, after a brief hesitation, Culpeper joins in.

Cast

Principal cast

Supporting cast

Cameo/uncredited appearances

Cast notes
According to Robert Davidson, the role of Irwin originally was offered to Joe Besser, who was unable to participate when Sheldon Leonard and Danny Thomas could not give him time off from his co-starring role in The Joey Bishop Show.

Actress Eve Bruce filmed a scene as a showgirl who asks Benjy Benjamin and Ding Bell to help her apply suntan lotion. The scene was cut, and she is uncredited. Cliff Norton is listed in the opening credits but is not found in the film; Norton had a role as a detective who appears at the Rancho Conejo airport. King Donovan, playing an airport official, appeared in the Rancho Conejo scenes but was cut from the film. Don Knotts originally shot a second scene in which he tries to use a telephone in a diner. Also featured in the scene was Barbara Pepper.

The first of the credited cast to die was ZaSu Pitts, who died on June 7, 1963, five months to the day before the film's release.  With the death of Carl Reiner on June 29, 2020, and Nicholas Georgiade on December 19, 2021, Barrie Chase is the film's last surviving cast member, credited or otherwise.  Mickey Rooney was the last living member of the main cast at the time of his death on April 6, 2014.

Production

Background
In the early 1960s, screenwriter William Rose, then living in the United Kingdom, conceived the idea for a film (provisionally titled So Many Thieves, and later Something a Little Less Serious) about a comedic chase through Scotland. He sent an outline to Kramer, who agreed to produce and direct the film. The setting was shifted to America, and the working title changed to Where, but in America? then One Damn Thing After Another and then It's a Mad World, with Rose and Kramer adding additional "Mads" to the title as time progressed. Kramer considered adding a fifth "mad" to the title before deciding it was redundant but noted in interviews that he later regretted it.

Although well known for serious films such as Inherit the Wind and Judgment at Nuremberg (both starring Tracy), Kramer set out to make the ultimate comedy film. Filmed in Ultra Panavision 70 and presented in Cinerama (becoming one of the early single-camera Cinerama features produced), Mad World had an all-star cast, with dozens of major comedy stars from all eras of cinema appearing in it. The film followed a Hollywood trend in the 1960s of producing "epic" films as a way of wooing audiences away from television and back to movie theaters. The film's theme music was written by Ernest Gold with lyrics by Mack David. Kramer hosted a roundtable (including extensive clips) on the film with stars Caesar, Hackett and Winters as part of a special The Comedians, Stanley Kramer's Reunion with the Great Comedy Artists of Our Time broadcast in 1974 as part of ABC's Wide World of Entertainment. The last reported showing of the film on major network television in America was on ABC on July 16, 1979, and before that, on CBS on May 16, 1978.

Filming

The airport terminal scenes were filmed at the now-defunct Rancho Conejo Airport in Newbury Park, California, though the control tower shown was constructed only for filming. Other airplane sequences were filmed at the Sonoma County Airport north of Santa Rosa, California; at the Palm Springs International Airport; and in the skies above Thousand Oaks, California; Camarillo, California; and Orange County, California. In the Orange County scene, stuntman Frank Tallman flew a Beech model C-18S through a highway billboard advertising Coca-Cola. A communications mix-up resulted in the use of linen graphic sheets on the sign rather than paper, as planned. Linen, much tougher than paper, damaged the plane on impact. Tallman managed to fly it back to the airstrip, discovering that the leading edges of the wings had been smashed all the way back to the wing spars. Tallman considered that incident the closest he ever came to dying on film. (Both Tallman and Paul Mantz, Tallman's business partner and fellow flier on Mad World, eventually died in separate air crashes over a decade apart.)

In another scene, Tallman flew the plane through an airplane hangar at the Charles M. Schulz Sonoma County Airport in Santa Rosa. Some scenes were filmed in San Diego.

The fire escape and ladder miniature used in the final chase sequence is on display at the Hollywood Museum in Hollywood. Also, the Santa Rosita Fire Department's ladder truck was a 1960s Seagrave Fire Apparatus open-cab Mid-Mount Aerial Ladder.

Production began on April 26, 1962, and expected to end by December 7, 1962, but took longer, apparently conflicting with the notion that Tracy's trip down the zip line into the pet store on December 6, 1962, was the last scene filmed. Veteran stuntman Carey Loftin was featured in the documentary, explaining some of the complexity as well as simplicity of stunts, such as the day he "kicked the bucket" as a stand-in for Durante.

Widescreen process
The film was promoted as the first film made in "one-projector" Cinerama. (The original Cinerama process filmed scenes with three separate cameras. The three processed reels were projected by three electronically synchronized projectors onto a huge curved screen.) It originally was planned for three-camera Cinerama, and some reports state that initial filming was done using three cameras but was abandoned. One-camera Cinerama could be Super Panavision 70 or Ultra Panavision 70, which was essentially the Super Panavision 70 process with anamorphic compression at the edges of the image to give a much wider aspect ratio. When projected by one projector, the expanded 70mm image filled the wide Cinerama screen. Ultra Panavision 70 was used to film It's a Mad, Mad, Mad, Mad World. Other films shot in Ultra Panavision 70 and released in Cinerama include The Greatest Story Ever Told, The Hallelujah Trail, Battle of the Bulge, and Khartoum. Super Panavision 70 films released in Cinerama include Grand Prix, 2001: A Space Odyssey, and Ice Station Zebra.

Animated credit sequence
Kramer's comedy was accentuated by many things, including the opening animated credits designed by Saul Bass. The film begins with mention of Spencer Tracy, then the "in alphabetical order" mention of nine of the main cast (Berle, Caesar, Hackett, Merman, Rooney, Shawn, Silvers, Terry-Thomas, Winters), followed by hands switching these nine names two to three times over. Animation continues with paper dolls and a windup toy world spinning with several men hanging on to it and finishing with a man opening a door to the globe and getting trampled by a mad crowd. One of the animators who helped with the sequence was future Peanuts animator Bill Melendez.

Reception

The film opened at the newly built Cinerama Dome in Los Angeles on November 7, 1963. The UK premiere was on December 2, 1963, at the Coliseum Cinerama Theatre in London's West End. Distinguished by the largest number of stars to appear in a film comedy, Mad World opened to acclaim from many critics and tremendous box office receipts, becoming the third highest-grossing film of 1963, quickly establishing itself as one of the top 100 highest-grossing films of all time when adjusted for inflation, earning an estimated theatrical rental figure of $26 million. It grossed $46,332,858 domestically and $60,000,000 worldwide, on a budget of $9.4 million. However, because costs were so high, it earned a profit of only $1.25 million.

Bosley Crowther of The New York Times wrote that the film "is everything, down to redundant, that its extravagant title suggests. It's a wonderfully crazy and colorful collection of 'chase' comedy, so crowded with plot and people that it almost splits the seams of its huge cinerama packing and its 3-hour-and-12-minute length." Variety stated "There are a number of truly spectacular action sequences, and the stunts that have been performed seem incredible. The automobile capers are some of the most thrilling and daring on record, Mack Sennett notwithstanding." However, the review continued, "Certain pratfalls and sequences are unnecessarily overdone to the point where they begin to grow tedious... but the plusses outweigh by far the minuses."

Philip K. Scheuer of the Los Angeles Times wrote that the film "really bugged me... the first few pratfalls have, perhaps their comic shock values. Thereafter the chase—and the homicidal mania—simply go on and on – countless cars are wrecked, a plane or two, an entire service station, the basement of a hardware store, fire escapes, a fire-engine tower. The only new idea, occurring well into the third hour, hinges on a surprise development in the character of a proud, plodding chief of detectives, played by Spencer Tracy – and even this proves disillusionment."

Richard L. Coe of The Washington Post was mixed, writing "Yes, it is furious, fast and funny and it is also vast, vulgar and vexatious because Kramer has not given us one sympathetic character and because it is shown in Cinerama." Paul Nelson wrote in Film Quarterly: "The film manages to stay on its feet for a little while and trundle self-importantly along, but it soon becomes painfully clear that its feet are flat and its wheels are square. Kramer lacks all the essentials of good comedy; he has few ideas, no cinematic or comic technique (the huge screen certainly didn't help him here: just one more technical burden), no sense of comic structure, and above all, no sense of pace."

The film's great success inspired Kramer to direct and produce Guess Who's Coming to Dinner (also starring Tracy and also written by William Rose) and The Secret of Santa Vittoria (also scored by Ernest Gold and co-written by Rose). The movie was re-released in 1970 and earned an additional $2 million in rentals.

The film holds a 71% approval rating on Rotten Tomatoes, based on 38 reviews, with an average score of 6.9/10. The consensus states: "It's long, frantic, and stuffed to the gills with comic actors and set pieces—and that's exactly its charm." According to Paul Scrabo, Kramer began thinking about his success with Mad World during the 1970s, and considered bringing back many former cast members for a proposed film titled The Sheiks of Araby. William Rose was set to write the screenplay. Years later, Kramer announced a possible Mad World sequel, which was to be titled It's a Funny, Funny World.

Awards and honors

The film is recognized by the American Film Institute in the following lists:
 2000: AFI's 100 Years...100 Laughs – #40

Soundtrack
"It's a Mad Mad Mad Mad World" (1963) - Music by Ernest Gold - Lyrics by Mack David
"You Satisfy My Soul" (1963) - Music by Ernest Gold - Lyrics by Mack David - Played by The Four Mads - Sung by The Shirelles
"Thirty-One Flavors" (1963) - Music by Ernest Gold - Lyrics by Mack David - Played by The Four Mads - Sung by The Shirelles

Home media
Existing footage is in the form of original 70 mm elements of the general release version (recent restored versions shown in revival screenings are derived from these elements). A 1991 VHS and LaserDisc from MGM/UA was an extended 183-minute version of the film, with most of the reinserted footage derived from elements stored in a Los Angeles warehouse about to be demolished. According to a 2002 interview with master preservationist Robert A. Harris, this extended version is not a true representation of the original roadshow cut and included footage that was not meant to be shown in any existing version.

A restoration effort was made by Harris in an attempt to bring the film back as close as possible to the original roadshow release. The project to go ahead with the massive restoration project would gain approval from Metro-Goldwyn-Mayer (parent company of UA), although it did require a necessary budget for it to proceed.

Released on January 21, 2014 originally as a two Blu-ray and three DVD set, the Criterion Collection release contains two versions of the film, a restored 4K digital film transfer of the 159-minute general release version and a new 197-minute high-definition digital transfer, reconstructed and restored by Harris using visual and audio material from the longer original "road-show" version not seen in over 50 years. Some scenes have been returned to the film for the first time, and the Blu-ray features a 5.1 surround DTS-HD Master Audio soundtrack. It also features a new audio commentary from It's a Mad, Mad, Mad, Mad World aficionados Mark Evanier, Michael Schlesinger, and Paul Scrabo, a new documentary on the film's visual and sound effects, an excerpt from a 1974 talk show hosted by Stanley Kramer featuring Sid Caesar, Buddy Hackett, and Jonathan Winters, a press interview from 1963 featuring Kramer and cast members, excerpts about the film's influence taken from the 2000 American Film Institute program 100 Years...100 Laughs, a two-part 1963 episode of Canadian TV program Telescope that follows the film's press junket and premiere, a segment from the 2012 special The Last 70mm Film Festival featuring surviving Mad World cast and crew members hosted by Billy Crystal, a selection of Stan Freberg's original TV and radio ads for the film with a new introduction by Freberg, trailers and radio spots from the 1960s/70s, and a booklet featuring an essay by film critic Lou Lumenick with new illustrations by cartoonist Jack Davis, along with a map of the shooting locations by artist Dave Woodman.

Influence
Films having a comedic search for money with an ensemble cast modeled after It's a Mad, Mad, Mad, Mad World include Scavenger Hunt (1979), Million Dollar Mystery (1987) and Rat Race (2001). There are similar Indian movies like Journey Bombay to Goa: Laughter Unlimited (2007), Dhamaal (2007), Mast Maja Maadi (2008) and Total Dhamaal (2019).

See also
 List of American films of 1963

References

External links

 
 
 
 
 
 "It's a Mad, Mad, Mad, Mad World: Nothing Succeeds Like Excess," an essay by Lou Lumenick at the Criterion Collection
 
 Writer Mark Evanier discusses his favorite movie
 Still a 'Mad, Mad, Mad, Mad World'?

1963 films
1963 comedy films
American chase films
American epic films
American comedy road movies
1960s English-language films
Films scored by Ernest Gold
Films directed by Stanley Kramer
Films produced by Stanley Kramer
Films set in California
Films shot in California
Films that won the Best Sound Editing Academy Award
Treasure hunt films
United Artists films
1960s American films
Films shot in San Diego
1960s comedy road movies
Comedy epic films
Films using stop-motion animation